Parapercis sexlorata, the sixstrap grubfish, is a fish species in the sandperch family, Pinguipedidae. It is found in Australia on the western Pacific side. 
This species can reach a length of  TL.

References

Pinguipedidae
Taxa named by Jeffrey W. Johnson
Fish described in 2013